The 1988 Australian Film Institute Awards were awards held by the Australian Film Institute to celebrate the best of Australian films and television of 1988. Twenty six films were entered for the feature film categories.

The 1988 AFI Awards attracted controversy, including for the lack of television broadcast and an Australian Writers' Guild boycott which resulted in the AFI withdrawing the screenplay categories.

Cinematographer Russell Boyd received the Raymond Longford Award for lifetime achievement and director George Ogilvie the Byron Kennedy Award.

Feature film

Television

Non-feature film

References

External links
 Official AACTA website

AACTA Awards ceremonies
1988 in Australian cinema